Karnataka Institute of Medical Sciences, Hubballi (KIMS, Hubli) is a medical school in Hubballi, India and is affiliated to the Rajiv Gandhi University of Health Sciences, Bangalore, Karnataka. It is one of the oldest government tertiary healthcare centers, and the largest multi-specialty hospital in North Karnataka, recognized by the Medical Council of India. In June 1997, the then Karnataka Medical College was accorded autonomous status and became the Karnataka Institute of Medical Sciences, Hubballi.

History
Karnataka Institute of Medical Sciences, Hubballi, (KIMS, Hubballi), formerly known as Karnataka Medical College, Hubballi, was established in August 1957 and One of the oldest Government medical college in Karnataka. For the first few years, the college was located in a building which was later known as J. G. Commerce College. The campus subsequently was shifted to the present location comprising  of land, on the Pune – Bangalore National Highway near Vidyanagar, Hubballi.

KIMS, Hubballi serves the society at large by providing tertiary health care services to the needy and by developing resources of health care providers and researchers.

The decade 1980-1990 changed the institute from being a nondescript hospital treating cancer patients to a well-known comprehensive regional center for cancer treatment and research. It is now capable of offering diagnostic and therapeutic services to cancer patients from Karnataka and neighboring states like Andhra Pradesh, Tamil Nadu, Kerala and Maharashtra. The institute was the first medical college in India to start a full-fledged post-graduate course in pediatrics.

For a brief period, due to lack of political will and poor funding, there was a progressive decline in staff, facilities and services offered. The government of Karnataka organized a Governing Council, and in June 1997, the then Karnataka Medical College was accorded autonomy and became the Karnataka Institute of Medical Sciences, Hubballi. The current objectives are providing comprehensive undergraduate and postgraduate medical and paramedical education, and developing facilities for research, training, screening, diagnosis, treatment, rehabilitation, palliative and preventive care for society at large. It now has well trained staff.

There has been steady progress in the facilities and the health care services that are available at the institute. The institute is equipped to provide some specialty services like Cardiology, Nephrology, Endocrinology, Neurology, Neurosurgery, Urology, Plastic surgery and Pediatric surgery. The Anti-Retroviral Treatment Center at KIMS, Hubballi has been recognized and is being developed as the nodal center for North Karnataka as well as the surrounding region. The Government of Karnataka has provided a cardiac catheterization lab to the Institute and has pledged to renew it as a Regional Cardiology Center. The institute has also been accorded the status of Institute of Excellence and recognized as a Training Center for WHO Fellowship. The addition of new blocks, Trauma Care Center and Maternal & Child Health Center is expected to increase the popularity of the hospital in the region. Phototherapy, dermabrasion and radio frequency have been newly added to the Department of Dermatology. The Karnataka institute of Medical sciences at Hubbali was selected by the Indian Council of Medical Research (ICMR) making the facility the only government controlled body in Karnataka as a centre of clinical trials. The centre is among the handful of other centres that are in the country that check the impact of any medicines or vaccines.

Teaching affiliates 
 
 Karnataka Institute of Medical Sciences Hospital, KIMS Campus, Hubballi 
 Dharwad Institute of Mental Health and Neuro Sciences (DIMHANS), Dharwad
 Anti Retroviral Therapy Center, KIMS Campus, Hubballi
 District Tuberculosis Center, KIMS Campus, Hubballi
 Urban Leprosy Center, KIMS Campus, Hubballi
 Urban Health Training Center, Old Hubballi
 Rural Health Training Center, Kundgol
 Primary Health Care Center, Kalghatgi
 Hubli Hospital for the Handicapped, Anandnagar, Hubballi
 KIMS Life Line Blood Bank, KIMS Campus, Hubballi
 Jaipur Center for Prosthetics, KIMS Campus, Hubballi
 Railway Hospital, Hubballi

Notable alumni

References

External links

 Official Website of Karnataka Institute of Medical Sciences, Hubli

Medical colleges in Karnataka
Universities and colleges in Hubli-Dharwad
Colleges affiliated to Rajiv Gandhi University of Health Sciences
Educational institutions established in 1957
1957 establishments in Mysore State